The Joseph Franklin Bland House (also known as the Franklin Bland House and "The Castle") is a historic house located at Winston-Salem, Forsyth County, North Carolina.

Description and history 
It was built in 1936, and is a 1-1/2 and two-story, asymmetrical Châteauesque style fieldstone dwelling. It features a circular stair tower with steep conical roof, irregularly placed stone chimneys, and multiple gables. The house incorporates railroad tracks in the support system, oil drums in the porthole windows, steel pipe in the stair railing, and heavy iron bolts hand-fashioned into door hardware. It was built for Frank Bland (1888–1940), who served as the organist of the First Presbyterian and St. Paul's Episcopal churches and established the Bland Piano Company.

It was listed on the National Register of Historic Places on August 21, 1984.

References 

Houses on the National Register of Historic Places in North Carolina
Châteauesque architecture in the United States
Houses completed in 1937
Houses in Winston-Salem, North Carolina
National Register of Historic Places in Winston-Salem, North Carolina